The 2011–2012 season is the 60th season of competitive football in Vanuatu.

National teams 

The home team or the team that is designated as the home team is listed in the left column; the away team is

in the right column.

Senior

2011 Pacific Games

2012 OFC Nations Cup

Vanuatu Premia Divisen

Vanuatuan clubs in international competitions

Amicale F.C.

References

 Vanuatu tables at Soccerway
 Vanuatuan national team at Soccerway